This is the list of Indian films that are released in 2018

Box office collection 
 
The list of highest-grossing Indian films released in 2018, by worldwide box office gross revenue, are as follows:

Lists of Indian films of 2018 
 
 List of Assamese films of 2018
 List of Bengali films of 2018
 List of Bollywood films of 2018
 List of Gujarati films of 2018
 List of Kannada films of 2018
 List of Malayalam films of 2018
 List of Marathi films of 2018
 List of Odia films of 2018
 List of Punjabi films of 2018
 List of Tamil films of 2018
 List of Telugu films of 2018
 List of Tulu films of 2018

References

 
2018 in India
2018 in film